The Haining Open  is a non-ranking snooker tournament. It was a minor-ranking part of the Players Tour Championship until 2015.

History
The tournament started in 2014 and was staged at the Haining Sports Center in Haining, Zhejiang, China. The inaugural tournament was won by Stuart Bingham who defeated fellow countryman Oliver Lines 4–0 in the final. In 2015, Ding Junhui won the tournament.

Matthew Selt was the winner of the now CBSA sanctioned Haining Open tournament in 2016. The event now sanctioned by CBSA wanted to keep the event after the recent demise of the Asian Tour. Thepchaiya Un-Nooh is the 2019 Haining Open champion.

As a result of travel restrictions brought about by the COVID-19 pandemic, the tournament did not run in the 2020–21 season. The 2021-22 edition of the event was played for Chinese players mostly due to the travel restrictions still being in place.

Winners

References

 
Recurring sporting events established in 2014
2014 establishments in China
Players Tour Championship
International sports competitions hosted by China
Sport in Zhejiang
Snooker competitions in China
Snooker non-ranking competitions
Haining